The Five Accursed Gentlemen is a 1932 French mystery drama film directed by Julien Duvivier and starring Anton Walbrook, Camilla Horn and Jack Trevor. It was made as the German-language version of Moon Over Morocco.

Cast
 Anton Walbrook as Petersen
 Camilla Horn as Camilla
 Jack Trevor as Strawber
 Allan Durant as Midlock
 Georges Péclet as Lawson
 Marc Dantzer as Woodland
 Hans Sternberg as Marouvelle

References

Bibliography

External links

1932 films
1932 mystery films
French mystery films
1930s German-language films
Films directed by Julien Duvivier
Films based on French novels
French multilingual films
Films set in Morocco
French black-and-white films
1932 multilingual films
1930s German films
1930s French films